For argument mapping, a Debategraph is a web-based, collaborative idea visualization tool, focusing on online deliberation about complex public policy issues.

It has been used by the White House, the UK Foreign and Commonwealth Office, the Amanpour series on CNN, and The Independent newspaper and was named as one of the Best Websites for Teaching and Learning by the American Association of School Librarians in 2010.

Debategraph is a social venture. Content posted on Debategraph is licensed under a CC BY-SA 3.0 license.

History
Debategraph was co-founded in March 2008 by the former Australian Minister for Higher Education Peter Baldwin and David Price.

See also
 Wicked problem

References

External links
 The Debategraph application
 Official blog and information

Argument mapping
Debate websites